John R. Bentson (May 15, 1937 – December 28, 2020) was an American neuroradiologist who invented the Better Brain-Imaging Tool.

Biography 
John Bentson was born on May 15, 1937, in Viroque, Wisconsin, and attended Viroqua High School. Bentson completed his B.S. in 1957 and in 1961, completed his M.D. at the University of Wisconsin.

From 1967 to 1968, he was the NIH Special Fellow in Neuroradiology, UCLA School of Medicine, Los Angeles. Bentson came up with an improved way to provide imaging of problems in the brain and spinal cord. He invented a Better Brain-Imaging Tool.

Bentson died of complications from COVID-19 at a Los Angeles hospital on December 28, 2020, aged 83.

Academic roles
 2002–2020  Professor emeritus, Department of Radiology, UCLA School of Medicine
 1981–2002  Professor of radiology, UCLA School of Medicine, Los Angeles, California
 1975–1981  Associate professor of radiology, UCLA School of Medicine, Los Angeles, California
 1969–1975  Assistant professor of radiology, UCLA School of Medicine, Los Angeles, California
 1968–1969  Assistant professor of radiology, University of Wisconsin Medical School, Madison, Wisconsin

Administrative roles
 1971–2002  Chief, Neuroradiology Section, Department of Radiological Sciences, UCLA School of Medicine, Los Angeles, California
 1986–1992  Chief, Neuro/Angio Division, Department of Radiological Sciences, UCLA School of Medicine, Los Angeles, California
 1984–1986  Chief, Division of Diagnostic Radiology, UCLA School of Medicine, Los Angeles, California
 1972–1977  Faculty supervisor, Photography Laboratory, Department of Radiological Sciences, UCLA School of Medicine, Los Angeles, California
 1970–1971  Acting chief, Neuroradiology Section, Department of Radiological Sciences, UCLA School of Medicine, Los Angeles, California
 1968–1969  Chief, Neuroradiology, University of Wisconsin, Medical School, Madison, Wisconsin

Honors and awards

 Leo G. Rigler Teaching Award, July 1995
 Roche Award, 1960

References 

1937 births
2020 deaths
American neurologists
People from Viroqua, Wisconsin
Deaths from the COVID-19 pandemic in California